The I Marbella Open is a tennis tournament held in Marbella, Spain in 2012. The event is part of the ATP Challenger Tour and is played on clay courts.

Past finals

Singles

Doubles

References

External links
Official website

 
ATP Challenger Tour
Defunct tennis tournaments in Spain
Clay court tennis tournaments
Recurring sporting events established in 2012